"A Cradle Song" is a poem by W. B. Yeats. The earlier version by Yeats was set as a war song by Ivor Gurney (1920).

References

Poetry by W. B. Yeats